Céline Spierer is a Swiss writer. Born in Geneva, she studied film at New York University, getting a bachelor's degree in screenwriting. She has worked as a consultant and assistant in various productions in the US and Switzerland. She lives in Manhattan. Le Fil rompu, her first novel, was published in 2020.

References

Writers from Geneva
Year of birth missing (living people)
Living people
New York University alumni